Clarkston, Netherlee and Williamwood is one of the five wards used to elect members of the East Renfrewshire Council. It elects three Councillors. The area covers the town of Clarkston, as well as the villages of Busby and Netherlee, all within East Renfrewshire.

Councillors

Election results

2022 election

2017 election

Notes

References

Wards of East Renfrewshire
Clarkston, East Renfrewshire